Bringsty Common is a scattered settlement and  of common land in Herefordshire, England, spanning the A44. It lies close to the Worcestershire border and within  of the town of Bromyard.

The area falls within the civil parish of Whitbourne. There is a pub, the Live and Let Live. The Brockhampton Estate lies to the west.

References

Parks and open spaces in Herefordshire
Hamlets in Herefordshire